Andrew Parkinson (Andy) was born in 1959 in Burnley, Lancashire, England and lives and works in Nottingham, England.  He studied art at Trent Polytechnic (now Nottingham Trent University) graduating in 1980.

Parkinson's paintings display evidence of a systems based process which explore themes of identity and similarity, repetition and the impossibility of repetition.

Selected exhibitions 
2017/18 - Contemporary Masters from Britain: 80 British Painters of the 21st Century, Tianjin Academy of Fine Arts Museum, China, Jiangsu Art Gallery, Nanjing, China, Jiangsu Museum of Arts and Crafts (Artall), Nanjing, China, Yantai Art Museum, China

2017 - Colour A Kind Of Bliss, The Crypt, Marylebone, London

2017 - Abstractions, Line Gallery, Stroud, UK

2016 - Imperfect Reverse, Camberwell Space Projects, Camberwell College of Arts, London

2015 - Clear Sight, Sluice Art Fair, London

2015 - Geometry: Wonky and Otherwise, Déda, Derby, UK

2015 - Summer Mix, Turps Banana Gallery, London

2015 - Generator; Systems, Logic and the Analogue Art of Programming, Kaleidoscope Gallery, Kent, UK

2015 - Contemporary British Abstraction, SE9 Container Gallery, London

2014 - Grey, Harrington Mill Studios, Nottingham, UK

2014 - Pareidolia, Pluspace, Coventry, UK

2014 - Launchpad; About Painting, Castlefield Gallery, Manchester, UK

2013 - Art Britania, Art Basel, Miami Beach, USA

2013 - The Discipline of Painting, Harrington Mill Studios, Nottingham, UK

Collections 
The Priseman Seabrook Collection, UK

References

External links 
 Andrew Parkinson Official
 Priseman Seabrook Collection

21st-century British painters
British male painters
Living people
1959 births
English contemporary artists
21st-century British male artists